Ben Dekker is a South African forester, surveyor, botanical expert, environmentalist, actor, politician, explorer, human rights activist, painter, sculptor, writer, poet and maverick.

Biography 
Benito Adolfo Dekker born 21 October 1940 in Centane, South Africa from newly arrived Dutch immigrants and grew up in Vincent, East London. He has two older brothers and two younger sisters. After matriculation from Selborne College at age 17 he was contracted for five years by the Department of Forestry. After completing two years of study at Saasveld Forestry College he was posted to Lottering Forest Station, Tsitsikamma. While stationed there, he studied for and qualified in surveying and drift sand reclamation, leading to him travelling widely throughout South African, more than he would have done as a forester.

In 1962 as soon as his contract with the department of forestry was completed he commenced a B.A. degree in philosophy and fine arts at Rhodes University, Grahamstown. To pay his way through university he worked as a lifeguard. For his master's degree in 1969 he wrote a thesis Bantu Philosophy. His thesis was turned down and then blacklisted by every South African university.

After Rhodes and a year travelling, in 1966 he moved to Cape Town to work as an actor and lightning technician with CAPAB, and to continue his studies at the University of Cape Town (UCT). He resubmitted his thesis, it was deemed politically incorrect and rejected again.

He was superintendent of Stan's Halt Hostel in Camps Bay Glen, before moving to 1 Dunkley Street, Gardens. Here he adopted eight street children until they could be found homes. During this time he also lived in a hut he had built in the bush at Oude Skip (aka Oude Schip) between Sandy Bay and Duiker Punt.

He was amongst the first actors to perform at the Space Theatre. Appearing in Gilgamesh and Donald Howarth's Othello Slegs Blankes (Othello Whites Only), i.e. Shakespeares's Othello without Othello due to the apartheid restriction that a black actor was not allowed on stage with a white Desdemona. He has appeared in 84 filmed productions.

In 1970 he stood against Sir De Villiers Graaff, the United Party leader, in the general election in the Rondebosch East constituency. With the slogan, "Stem lekker, Stem Dekker" (Vote Well, Vote Dekker). Also calling for universal suffrage which at the height of apartheid was outside of political discourse. He challenged Graaff to a swimming race to Robben Island. Instead of offices he obtained a fruit vendor's cart as a platform to speak from or just to recline in various parts of Rondebosch. He attracted enough supporters to at least retain his deposit.

Considered politically dangerous his passport was suspended however he still managed to tour the whole of Africa, either on an Amnesty International passport or none at all, hitching rides, sometimes getting flights by helping pilots load cargo. He was a master of living off the land, often spending the night with the locals in the bushveldt.

He remained in Cape Town until 1980 when moved to Port St. Johns where he lived for the next 38 years in a hut he'd built in Mthumbane forest next to Second Beach, living off the sea, the forest and a small vegetable garden. He was something of a tourist attraction himself, Lily’s Lodge at Second Beach named their bar Ben’s Bar. While living here, before the AIDS orphanage at Qunu opened, he personally took on the care of many of the local AIDS orphans until someone could take them in or they could fend for themselves. He opened many trails around Port St. Johns, wrote and illustrated a booklet Operation footprint about these and guided nature hikes.

As a peacekeeping delegate for Amnesty International  in war-torn African countries he would arrive on foot and by the time rest of the convoy arrived had already established some sort of rapport with the locals.

In 2018 he returned to Cape Town, and now lives in a caravan in Woodstock.

Productions taken part in

Theatre 
 1966, Die Loodswaaiers by Uys Krige, CAPAB, set design, music, acting
 Jul. 1968, Cape Charade or Kaatje Kekkelbek by Guy Butler, Hofmeyr Theatre, CAPAB
 1970, Titus Andronicus by William Shakespeare, Hofmeyr Theatre, CAPAB
 Apr. 1972, Gilgamesh by Tessa Marwick, The Space
 Jun. 1972, Othello Slegs Blankes by Donald Howarth, The Space
 Aug. 1979, Egoli: City of Gold by Matsemela Manaka, The Space, design

Film 
 1973, Die Wildtemmer as Kobus le Grange
 1973, Seun van die Wildtemmer as Kobus le Grange
 1974, House of the Living Dead as Jan
 1987, Survivor guest starring as Prophet

Television 
 1980, Sam et Sally (French TV series) as Sauerlein, in season 2, episode 4, La Peau du lion
 1982, Die Vlakte Duskant Hebron (South African TV series) as Ghaitshi Ghubi - one of his best known roles.
 1983, The Outcast (TV movie) as Adam

Publications

Poetry 
 Aas vir Aspoestertjie, 1986
 Baai besoekers, 1993
 Dylan Thomas - 20 Gedigte, translated and illustrated, Bitkop Publikasies, 2000,

Anthologies 
 Am I still alive? by Ben Dekker, self published, 22 pages. Mostly contains just under thirty short anecdotes about the idiocy of apartheid.

Novels 
 Mostly written under pseudonyms and printed in Nigeria.

Notes

References

Further reading 
 Who's really who in South Africa by Hilary Prendini Toffoli and Gus Silber, Jonathan Ball Publishers, 1989, p. 51
 Am I still alive? by Ben Dekker, self published, 22 pages. Mostly contains just under thirty short anecdotes about the idiocy of apartheid.
 With a beer in the hand, by Brian Bredenkamp, 2007, revised edition 2016. Includes a few Ben anecdotes. 
 Women of East London (formerly Port Rex): 1900-1979 by John Philip Shingler, Griffith Standard Co., 1980, . Has a few pages including mention of his parents and siblings.

External links
 Bantu Philosophy thesis by Ben Dekker, posted online in 2012
 Ben Dekker, Encyclopaedia of South African Theatre, Film, Media and Performance (ESAT)
 Poësie in PSJ - 'n onderhoud met Ghaitshi Ghubi, interview of Ben Dekker by Philip John (in Afrikaans)
 Ben Dekker, IMDB
 Brian Bredenkamp, Flickr, includes some photos with Ben Dekker
 Papers from independent candidate Ben Dekker, 1970 (paywalled)
  Walking trails in and around Port St Johns, planned and mapped by Ben Dekker (archived).

YouTube 
 Ben Dekker, 'n reus in die ruigtes., WegTV, 6 May 2014
 Ben Dekker oor grootword, tahrs en 'n nuwe stam begin, Netwerk24, 21 Mar 2018
 Die Wêreld is ons woning nie - Karakter, kykNET, 28 Jun 2021

Living people
1940 births
South African male stage actors
South African foresters
Rhodes University alumni
White South African people
South African people of Dutch descent
South African male television actors
South African male film actors